Remus Câmpeanu (8 September 1938 – 3 April 2021) was a Romanian footballer who played as a left-back for Universitatea Cluj.

Career
Remus Câmpeanu was born on 8 September 1938 in Cluj-Napoca, Romania and started to play junior level football in 1951 at local club, Flamura Roșie. In 1960 he was advised by Ștefan Kovács to go to play for Universitatea Cluj where on 4 September he made his Divizia A debut under coach Andrei Sepci in a 2–0 away loss in front of Corvinul Hunedoara. He helped the club win the 1964–65 Cupa României, being used by Sepci in the whole game of the 2–1 victory from the final against Argeș Pitești in which he opened the score. In the following season, Câmpeanu made his debut in European competitions, playing four games in the 1965–66 European Cup Winners' Cup, helping "U" Cluj eliminate Austrian team, Wiener Neustadt in the first round, being eliminated in the following round by Atlético Madrid. In the 1971–72 season he helped The Red Caps finish on the 3rd position and two years later on 19 June 1974 he made his last Divizia A appearance on 19 June 1974 in a 2–0 away loss in front of FC Constanța, having a total of 328 matches with 3 goals scored in the competition. After his retirement from playing football, Câmpeanu was Universitatea Cluj's president from 1975 until 1989 and for a short while in 2008. Even do he played for Romania B, Remus Câmpeanu never played for Romania's senior team and on 13 May 2020, Gazeta Sporturilor included him on a list of best Romanian players who never played for the senior national team.

Personal life
When Remus Câmpeanu was diagnosed with appendicitis, he requested his team colleague and captain, Traian Georgescu who also worked as a surgeon to operate him. His nephew Septimiu Câmpeanu was also a footballer who played at Universitatea Cluj. On 13 May 2013, on Cluj Arena during the halftime of the match between Universitatea Cluj and CSMS Iași he received the title of Honorary Citizen of Cluj County - "Clujean of Honor". Remus Câmpeanu died on 3 April 2021 at age 82.

Honours
Universitatea Cluj
Cupa României: 1964–65

References

External links
 

1938 births
2021 deaths
Romanian footballers
Association football defenders
Liga I players
FC Universitatea Cluj players
Sportspeople from Cluj-Napoca
Romanian sports executives and administrators